Liberal–Unionists were supporters of the Liberal Party of Canada who, as a result of the Conscription Crisis of 1917 rejected Sir Wilfrid Laurier's leadership and supported the coalition Unionist government of Sir Robert Borden.

Much of the Ontario Liberal Party declared themselves to be Liberal–Unionists, including provincial party leader Newton Rowell, who joined Borden's Cabinet, and a variety of Liberal MPs.

In the 1917 election, many Liberals ran as Liberal–Unionists or Unionists against the Laurier Liberals.

After the war, most Liberal–Unionists rejoined the Liberal Party despite efforts by Borden and Arthur Meighen to make the coalition permanent by renaming the Conservative party the National Liberal and Conservative Party. Several Liberal–Unionists ended up staying with the Conservatives including Hugh Guthrie and Robert Manion.

See also
List of political parties in Canada

Federal political parties in Canada
Liberal Party of Canada